Laelia rosea may refer to:
 Laelia rosea (moth), a species of insect
 Laelia rosea (plant), a species of orchid